Denise Oliver-Velez (born August 1, 1947) is an American professor, contributing editor, activist and community organizer. Specifically, she is a contributing editor for the blog Daily Kos, and is a former adjunct professor of anthropology and women's studies at SUNY New Paltz.

Early life
Born Denise Roberts Oliver on August 1, 1947, in Brooklyn, New York, she is the daughter of George B. Oliver, an actor and professor of dramatic literature at Nassau Community College, and a Tuskegee Airman, and Marjorie Roberts Oliver, a teacher in the New York City school system.

Education

Early education and activism 
In September 1960, Oliver-Velez enrolled in Music and Art High School. During her teenage years, Oliver-Velez participated in civil rights work as a member of the Queens branch of the NAACP, which was led by former New York City judge William Booth. In 1963, for example, Oliver-Velez blocked bulldozers as part of a civil disobedience action Booth organized to demand employment for black workers at a Rochdale Village (Queens) construction project.

Howard University 
In the fall of 1965, Denise Oliver-Velez transferred to Howard University, an HBCU in Washington D.C., after a year enrolled in Hunter College. At Howard University in 1968, Olive-Velez was suspended due to her refusal to "behave like a nice Howard lady". While she attended Howard University, she joined the Student Nonviolent Coordinating Committee (SNCC) and participated in Students for a Democratic Society. Oliver-Velez, along with a small group of fellow black activists including Hubert Brown (H. Rap Brown), started a campaign at the university. Their goal was to improve Howard University's political and cultural methods in regard to showing awareness on black struggles of students and administration.

Activism 
Oliver-Velez was a member of both The Young Lords and The Black Panther Party.

The Young Lords Party

Machismo and male chauvinism 
While in the Young Lords, according to herself she and others challenged one of the organization's points in their 13-Point Program and Platform. As she states, "I was in the Young Lords, and one of the points in the original program was ‘Revolutionary Machismo.’ Machismo is reactionary, so you can’t have revolutionary machismo. We women weren’t having it. So we made a very different kind of statement. ‘We want equality for women. Down with machismo and male chauvinism.'"

Meeting at Baraka's house 
Felipe Luciano invited Oliver-Velez to a meeting at poet & activist, Amiri Baraka's house in Newark, New Jersey before she was a committee member in the Young Lords Party to discuss stronger alliance. At this meeting, Oliver-Velez, the only female Luciano invited from the YLP, observed the inferior behavior of the women in Baraka's organization. After Oliver-Velez's questions about women's roles were ignored, she left the meeting concerned and reflected.

Roles Within YLP 
However, in 1970 Oliver-Velez was appointed as Minister of Economic Development and became the highest ranking woman in the party.

Denise Oliver-Velez was the first woman that was elected to be on the Young Lords Party leadership board, the central committee. While being a member in the YLP, Oliver-Velez first served as a minister finance and then as a minister of economic development. Amongst Oliver-Velez's membership in the YLP, she also held the position of Officer of the Day in 1969. This leadership position called for overseeing daily activity within the organization and instilling discipline on membership and duties of current members.

Women struggles Within YLP 
The women's caucus issued demands to the Central Committee of the Young Lords that called for an end to sexual discrimination and the full inclusion of women into the leadership of the Lords. The Central Committee reacted by quickly promoting Oliver-Velez and Gloria Fontanez to the Central Committee. They also adopted a new slogan, ¡Abajo con el machismo! (Down with Machismo!). However, these changes did not happen immediately and women still faced sexism within the party regularly. Oliver-Velez became aware of gendered assumptions made by the central committee about who could and could not perform certain tasks. Even when women were assigned to posts in various ministries, including the Defense Ministry, they were disproportionately assigned traditional "women's work" like child care and secretarial tasks.

YLP activity 

By May 1970, the New York section of the Young Lords followed its then Central Committee (which included Oliver-Velez, Officer of the Day) and decided to break away from the national Young Lords' office in Chicago, renaming their new group the Young Lords Party. The separation was never a hostile one and had more to do with the rapid development of the group—or "growing pains"—a natural friendly competition between cities, and primarily by infiltration and repression by government groups that were trying to create conflict between the chapters to divide and ultimately destroy the newly formed movement. Despite their considerable presence in the Young Lords Party, female members were consistently overlooked to occupy high-ranking leadership positions.

Contributions 
Denise Oliver-Velez was one of the prominent contributors to the Young Lords Party bilingual newspaper, Pa'lante. Oliver-Velez wrote and edited articles for Pa'lante newspaper as well as producing political artwork, publishing and distributing the newspaper. She was also included in the original Young Lords Party team, where she helped to create the newspaper's first layouts.

One of the major contributions women made to the success of the Young Lords Party included publishing its Position Paper on Women, which was later included in The Young Lords: A Reader (2010), edited by Darrel Enck-Wanzer. In 1970, Oliver-Velez helped construct the paper and theorized the intersection of race and class in the lives of women of color for it. She and another former Young Lords member, Iris Morales, wrote a foreword for The Young Lords: A Reader (2010).

In addition to her activism with the Young Lords, Oliver-Velez was also an AIDS movement activist and a member of the Black Panther Party. She published ethnographic research as part of HIV/AIDS intervention projects.

Career and more information

Vista volunteer 
Denise Oliver-Velez joined the Real Great Society (RGS), a Puerto Rican East Harlem social service in New York City with connections to anti-poverty programs. She also worked with University of the Streets to reform New York's youth gangs. Through networks from University of the Streets, Oliver-Velez taught Black and Puerto Rican students who were expelled from New York public schools about Black and Puerto Rican history.

Old Westbury

Professor

Editor

More information 
Oliver-Velez was a program director and co-founder of WPFW-FM in Washington, D.C., Pacifica's first minority-controlled radio station, and worked in  public broadcasting and community media for many years.Denise unknowingly probably made one of the biggest contributions to radio history. She was the program director that introduced Robin Quivers to Howard Stern!!! The rest is history.

She was also the executive director of the Black Filmmaker Foundation.

Oliver-Velez is featured in the 2014 feminist documentary film She's Beautiful When She's Angry.

In August 2020, Oliver-Velez gave a rare  interview on Bryan Knight's Tell A Friend podcast, where she candidly spoke about her life and activism in the Young Lords.

References

External links

 Oliver-Velez, Denise, The Borinqueneers: Award Them the Gold; The Daily Kos; 5/27/2013
 Full text of The Young Lords: A Reader  (2010), edited by Darrel Enck-Wanzer

1947 births
Activists for Hispanic and Latino American civil rights
American feminists
Living people
Members of the Black Panther Party
Young Lords
20th-century American women
21st-century American women